Fabrice Lapierre (born 17 October 1983 in Réduit, Mauritius) is a Mauritian-born Australian long jumper.

Lapierre placed 4th at the 2009 World Championships in Berlin, Germany, behind another Australian, Mitchell Watt, who took the bronze. At the 2010 World Indoor Championships in Doha, Qatar, Lapierre won the gold medal with a jump of 8.17 metres, beating both Watt and the defending champion Godfrey Mokoena of South Africa.

His personal best jump is 8.40 metres, achieved on 14 July 2010 in Nuoro. Prior to this, his lifetime best was 8.35 metres, achieved on 4 July 2009 in Madrid. He jumped 8.57 metres at the same competition, but there was too much wind (+3.6 metres per second).

On April 18, 2010, at the Australian Athletics Championship in Perth, Lapierre grabbed the national title with a last-round jump of 8.78, again with an illegal tailwind of +3.1 metres per second. This was the longest jump in the world under any conditions since Iván Pedroso's 8.96 in Sestriere in 1995.

Lapierre competed for Texas A&M University in college, and was the NCAA long jump champion at the 2005 NCAA Outdoor National Track and Field Championships.

In 2011, Lapierre competed in the third season of the Channel Seven television series Australia's Greatest Athlete.

Achievement s

Coaching career 
Lapierre currently coaches in the Huntington Beach, CA, area with the private coaching service  CoachUp.

References

External links 

1983 births
Living people
Australian male long jumpers
Australian people of Mauritian descent
Athletes (track and field) at the 2006 Commonwealth Games
Athletes (track and field) at the 2010 Commonwealth Games
Athletes (track and field) at the 2014 Commonwealth Games
Athletes (track and field) at the 2018 Commonwealth Games
Athletes (track and field) at the 2008 Summer Olympics
Athletes (track and field) at the 2016 Summer Olympics
Olympic athletes of Australia
Texas A&M Aggies men's track and field athletes
People from Moka District
Mauritian people of French descent
Commonwealth Games gold medallists for Australia
World Athletics Championships athletes for Australia
World Athletics Championships medalists
Commonwealth Games bronze medallists for Australia
Commonwealth Games medallists in athletics
Diamond League winners
World Athletics Indoor Championships winners
IAAF World Athletics Final winners
Medallists at the 2006 Commonwealth Games
Medallists at the 2010 Commonwealth Games